Robert Carl Takac Jr. (born September 30, 1964) is an American rock bassist and vocalist. Takac is one of the founding members of the Goo Goo Dolls, along with Johnny Rzeznik.

Background
Takac was born in Buffalo, New York and grew up in the Buffalo suburb of West Seneca with his parents and younger sister. One of his grandparents was Hungarian, which is reflected by his name (originally written: Takács, which is Hungarian for 'weaver'). He graduated from West Seneca East Senior High School in 1982. He graduated from Medaille College with a Communication degree, with an emphasis on Radio Broadcasting. In his college years, he played in several bands and interned and worked at a local Buffalo radio station.

In 2008, Takac was named to the Medaille College Board of Trustees.

Music career
Takac began his musical career as a member of the rock band Monarch, prior to joining the Beaumonts, which broke up in 1985. He met guitarist John Rzeznik through the Beaumonts and together they found a drummer, George Tutuska and started a band which they named the "Sex Maggots", with Takac as the lead singer and bassist. In 1986, they changed their name to the more promotable "Goo Goo Dolls", and after three albums moved Rzeznik to the majority of lead vocals. In late 1994, Takac and Rzeznik fired Tutuska and in early 1995 hired Mike Malinin as a replacement. Later that year they received their first commercial success with the single "Name". The 1998 follow-up "Iris" reached number one on several charts, including the Hot 100 Airplay. Goo Goo Dolls have been releasing music and touring continuously since.

In 2009, the band recorded Something for the Rest of Us in Buffalo, New York, at their studio Inner Machine Studios. That year, Takac opened the studio to the public as GCR Audio.

Side projects
In 2003, Takac joined with Brian Schulmeister to form the dance music collective Amungus. That same year, Takac started his own record label, Good Charamel Records, in Buffalo, New York. With an initial focus on local acts, the first three bands signed to the label were Klear, The Juliet Dagger, and Last Conservative. Today the label primarily releases J-Rock music in North America by female-fronted bands such as Shonen Knife, Tsushimamire, LazyGunsBrisky, Pinky Doodle Poodle and MOLICE.

In 2004, Takac founded the Music is Art Festival, a not-for-profit organization, and operates as their president. MiA seeks to explore and reshape music's cultural, social, and educational impact on the community. Active throughout the year, MiA is supported by a multitude of programs, concerts, and events, ranging from collecting and donating instruments to local schools, mental health awareness tours, music industry education, among others.

Equipment
Takac primarily plays Yamaha BB-series bass guitars, but he has also played Fender and Zon bass guitars.

Discography

Goo Goo Dolls 

Superstar Car Wash (1993)
A Boy Named Goo (1995)
Dizzy Up The Girl (1998)
Gutterflower (2002)
Let Love In (2006)
Something for the Rest of Us (2010)
Magnetic (2013)
Boxes (2016)
 Miracle Pill (2019)

References

External links
 Official Goo Goo Dolls website
 Official Amungus website
 Robby's myspace page
 Good Charamel Records, Robby's record label
 Music is Art, Robby's charity organization
 
 GCR Audio, Robby's (GGDs) Studio
 Takac joins Medaille College Board of Trustees

1964 births
Living people
Alternative rock bass guitarists
Alternative rock singers
American alternative rock musicians
American male singers
American people of Hungarian descent
American rock bass guitarists
American male bass guitarists
American rock singers
Goo Goo Dolls members
Singers from New York (state)
Musicians from Buffalo, New York
Guitarists from New York (state)
20th-century American guitarists